Umpila is an Aboriginal Australian language, or dialect cluster, of the Cape York Peninsula in northern Queensland. It is spoken by about 100 Aboriginal people, many of them elderly.

Geographic distribution 
The land territory associated with the Umpila language group is located along the northeastern coast of Cape York Peninsula and stretches from the northern end of Temple Bay south to the Massey Creek region at the top of Princess Charlotte Bay, and west of the Great Dividing Range towards the township of Coen. Most of the remaining Umpila and Kuuku Ya'u speakers reside in Lockhart River Aboriginal Community, which is located at Lloyd Bay, roughly at the boundary between Umpila and Kuuku Ya'u lands.

Varieties 
The chief varieties of Umpila, variously considered dialects or distinct languages, are:
Umpila proper
Kanju (Kandju, Kaantyu, Gandju, Gandanju, Kamdhue, Kandyu, Kanyu, Karnu), also Jabuda, Neogulada, Yaldiye-Ho
Kuuku-Yaʼu (Yaʼo, Koko-Jaʼo, Kokoyao), also Bagadji (Pakadji)
Kuuku Yani (extinct)
Uutaalnganu (extinct)
Kuuku Iʼyu (extinct)

Phonology
Umpila consonant inventory

Umpila vowel inventory

Grammar 
Typologically, Umpila is an agglutinative, suffixing, dependent-marking language, with a preference for Subject-Object-Verb constituent order. Grammatical relations are indicated by a split ergative case system: nominal inflections are ergative/absolutive, pronominals are nominative/accusative. Features of note include: historical dropping of initial consonants, complex verbal reduplication expressing progressivity and habitual aspect, 'optional' ergative marking.

Sign language

The Umpila have (or had) a well-developed signed form of their language. It is one of the primary components of Far North Queensland Indigenous Sign Language.

See also
Avoidance speech

Bibliography
Chase, A. K. 1979. Cultural Continuity: Land and Resources among East Cape York Aborigines. In Stevens, N. C. and Bailey, A. (eds). Contemporary Cape York Peninsula. Canberra: Australian Institute of Aboriginal Studies.
Chase, A. K. 1980. Which way now? Tradition, continuity and change in a north Queensland Aboriginal Community. Unpublished PhD thesis. Brisbane: University of Queensland.
Chase, A. K. 1984. Belonging to Country: Territory, Identity and Environment in Cape York Peninsula, Northern Australia. In L.R. Hiatt (ed) Aboriginal Landowners: Contemporary issues in the determination of traditional Aboriginal land ownership. Sydney: Sydney University Press.
Rigsby, B. and Chase, A. 1998. The Sandbeach People and Dugong Hunters of Eastern Cape York Peninsula: property in Land and Sea Country. Rigsby, B and Peterson, N. (eds) Customary Marine Tenure in Australia. Sydney. Oceania 48:192-218.
Thompson, D. 1988. Lockhart River ‘Sand Beach’ Language: An Outline of Kuuku Ya'u and Umpila. Darwin: Summer Institute of Linguistics.
Thomson, D. F. 1933. The Hero Cult, Initiation Totemism on Cape York. Royal Anthropological Institute Journal 63: 453-537.
Thomson, D. F. 1934. Notes on a Hero Cult from the Gulf of Carpentaria, North Queensland. Royal Anthropological Institute Journal 64: 217-262.

References 

North Cape York Paman languages
Agglutinative languages
Subject–object–verb languages
Endangered indigenous Australian languages in Queensland
Severely endangered languages